AS Eesti Liinirongid, operating as Elron, is a government-owned passenger train operator in Estonia.

The company was founded as a subsidiary of Eesti Raudtee in 1998, and separated shortly thereafter. Prior to 2014, the company operated exclusively the electrified commuter rail system in Harjumaa, and was known until October 2013 as Elektriraudtee, i.e. "the Electrical Railway". On 1 January 2014 Elron took over all domestic passenger train services in Estonia from Edelaraudtee.

Network

Inter-city rail 
Elron operates inter-city trains from Tallinn's Balti jaam on several lines: Tallinn–Tartu–Valga (connecting to Pasažieru vilciens trains to Riga), Tallinn–Tartu–Koidula, Tallinn–Narva, and Tallinn–Viljandi.

Services on the Tallinn–Pärnu route ended in December 2018. The line required substantial upgrading and it was not felt worthwhile spending the money required for this around 8 years before Rail Baltica is due to provide much faster service to Pärnu.

Tallinn commuter rail 

Tallinn's commuter rail network is electrified, and it extends east and west from Balti jaam, the total length of the network being . The eastbound line goes to Aegviidu. The westbound line goes to the town of Keila, where it divides into two branches continuing towards the cargo-harbour city of Paldiski and inland to Turba. The Paldiski branch splits at Klooga, with a short spur going to the beach at Klooga-rand.

Work to upgrade track and the stations took place in the early 2010s.

Rolling stock 

Elron currently uses 38 Stadler FLIRT electric and diesel-electric trains.

Delivery of the 12 three-car and 6 four-car EMU and 6 two-car, 8 three-car and 6 four-car DEMU trains built by Stadler Rail started in 2012; by June 2014 all trains had arrived in Estonia. As of 2015, all of the old Soviet trains were retired.

As of June 2019, Elron received permission to purchase 4 new hybrid trains with an option to add 2 electric trains. The decision was due to overcrowding (as of 2019) on the most popular routes, given an increase of passenger number of more than a third since the replacement of the rolling stock with the Stadler fleet in 2014.

Elron announced in October 2020 that Škoda Transportation won the procurement for six new electric trains with an option to buy 10 more. Škoda will provide six dual system electric trains (Škoda 21Ev, InterPanter), currently set to begin operating on the electrified Tallinn-Tartu route in December, 2024. The total sum of the six trains is €56.2 million, and the handover will be carried out in the second half of 2024. The trains are planned to have a number of replaceable seats that can be moved to create more space for bicycles in warm months and for more seating in colder months. The Škoda and Stadler trains will be in operation simultaneously beginning from 2024.

See also 
 Rail transport in Estonia
 GoRail, a company operating Tallinn–Saint Petersburg and Tallinn–Moscow services
 Helsinki commuter rail
 Pasažieru vilciens, a company operating Valga–Riga services
 Public transport in Tallinn
 Tallinn–Tapa railway

References

External links 

 

Railway companies of Estonia
Companies based in Tallinn